10th Corps, Tenth Corps, or X Corps may refer to:

France
 10th Army Corps (France)
 X Corps (Grande Armée), a unit of the Imperial French Army during the Napoleonic Wars

Germany
 X Corps (German Empire), a unit of the Imperial German Army
 X Reserve Corps (German Empire), a unit of the Imperial German Army
 X Army Corps (Wehrmacht), a unit in World War II
 X SS Corps, a unit in World War II

Russia-USSR 
 10th Army Corps (Russian Empire)
 10th Rifle Corps (USSR)
 10th Mechanized Corps (Soviet Union)

Others
 X Corps (Ottoman Empire)
 X Corps (Pakistan)
 X Army Corps (Spain)
 X Corps (United Kingdom)
 X Corps (United States)
 X Corps (Union Army)

See also
List of military corps by number
 10th Army (disambiguation)
 10th Battalion (disambiguation)
 10th Brigade (disambiguation)
 10th Division (disambiguation)
 10th Regiment (disambiguation)
 10th Squadron (disambiguation)